Events from the year 1797 in Ireland.

Incumbent
Monarch: George III

Events
May – Henry Grattan retires from the Irish House of Commons.
Lord Castlereagh is appointed Keeper of the King's Signet for Ireland, a Commissioner of the Treasury for Ireland and a Member of the Privy Council of Ireland.
Royal Black Institution formed from Orangemen as a Protestant loyalist fraternal society.

Arts and literature
William Drennan writes the ballad The Wake of William Orr.

Births
24 February – Samuel Lover, songwriter, novelist and portrait miniaturist (died 1868).
2 June – Joseph Blake, 3rd Baron Wallscourt, socialist (died 1849).
20 November – Tyrone Power, actor, comedian, author and theatrical manager (died 1841).
John Doyle, artist (died 1868).
Charles C. Ingham, painter and founder of the National Academy of Design in New York City (died 1863).
Laurence F. Renehan, priest and historian (died 1857).

Deaths
9 July – Edmund Burke, statesman, author, orator, political theorist and philosopher (born 1729)
11 July – Charles Macklin, actor and dramatist (born 1690).
14 October – William Orr, member of the United Irishmen, executed (born 1766).

References

 
Years of the 18th century in Ireland
Ireland
1790s in Ireland